Thomas Eriksson may refer to:

 Thomas Eriksson (athlete) (born 1963), Swedish athlete
 Thomas Eriksson (ice hockey) (born 1959), Swedish ice hockey player
 Thomas Eriksson (skier) (born 1959), Swedish skier

See also
 Tom Erikson (born 1964), wrestler and mixed martial artist
Tomaz Eriksson (born 1967), Swedish ice hockey player